The PKP Pecheneg (Pulemyot Kalashnikova Pekhotny "Pecheneg") is a Russian 7.62×54mmR general-purpose machine gun. It is a further development and modification of the PK machine gun (PKM). It is said to be more accurate than all its predecessors due to a heavier, removable, partially forced-air-cooled barrel with radial cooling ribs and a handle which eliminates the haze effect from hot gases and keeps the barrel cooler, making the weapon more reliable. Furthermore, the weapon is capable of having a telescopic sight or other sights mounted on it, which increases its accuracy and effective range.

The GRAU index of the PKP Pecheneg is "6P41" or "6P41N" (PKP Pecheneg-N) when fitted with a mounting rail for a night vision sight. It is currently in use by Russian Army Spetsnaz and other troops in significant numbers. Even though it was developed mainly for infantry use, it also has been fitted to several light vehicles.

Name
The PKP Pecheneg is named after the Pecheneg people, a warlike tribe of Turkic origin who lived in what later became the steppes of southern Russia and Ukraine.

Design
According to the manufacturer, the PKP Pecheneg can fire 600 rounds in rapid fire scenarios without damaging the barrel. When conducting a long firefight, it can fire up to 10,000 rounds of ammunition per hour (effective rate of fire ≈ 166 rounds per minute) without degrading the combat characteristics and reducing the life of the barrel. In general, the PKP Pecheneg retained up to 80% parts commonality with the PKM

A steel jacket encloses the barrel from the front of the trunnion to the muzzle. Middle part of the barrel, from the front of the trunnion, to the gas block has transverse grooves to increase the surface area for better cooling. There are oval holes on the jacket in the ribbed section of the barrel for access of air.

From the gas block to the muzzle there are 4 longitudinal grooves cut in the barrel. They are covered by the jacket. The grooves connect 4 holes in the gas block and 4 holes on the front end of the muzzle device. Low pressure created at the front of the jacket during firing draws cool air through the grooves, cooling the front part of the barrel, similarly to the Lewis machine gun.

Constant forced cooling of the front part of the barrel reduces dispersion when firing, and also increases the durability of the barrel. The service life of the barrel is estimated at 25,000 to 30,000 rounds.

Variants 

 Pecheneg-N: GRAU index is "6P41N", similar to the Pecheneg but features a mounting rail for night vision sights.
 Pecheneg-SP: GRAU index is "6P69", is an improved variant of the PKP Pecheneg. It has two main versions; a standard version and a special forces version. Titanium is now used for its construction. It was also reported that it now features a Picatinny rail for mounting the 1P89-3 unified optical sight and other optical sights, a telescopic folding stock and at the request of the Russian military, an additional tactical handle for convenience when firing. According to the manufacturers, during transportation the gun can be folded, making it 30 mm (3 cm) shorter than the regular Kalashnikov rifle. It uses a shortened barrel and a suppressor for noiseless and flameless fire. Its serial production started in February 2017.
 Pecheneg bullpup: is a bullpup conversion of the PKP Pecheneg developed by the Degtyarev plant.

Users

References

External links 

 7.62-mm "Petcheneg" Machine Gun – Design Bureau Website
 Продукция Producer website
 Modern Firearms
 warfare.ru – 7.62 Pecheneg Machine Gun
 Pecheneg Bullpup
 «Pecheneg» Kalashnikov infantry machine gun

7.62×54mmR machine guns
Gas-operated firearms
General-purpose machine guns
Machine guns of Russia
Medium machine guns
Post–Cold War weapons of Russia
TsNIITochMash products
Weapons and ammunition introduced in 2001